Langside is an area in Glasgow, Scotland.

Langside may also refer to:

 Henry Wilson, Baron Wilson of Langside (1916–1997), Scottish lawyer, Labour politician and life peer
 Battle of Langside, 1568 battle in Langside, Glasgow
 Langside College, a higher and furth education college in Glasgow
 Langside railway station, railway station in Glasgow
 Langside Synagogue, a synagogue in Glasgow
 Langside (ward), one of the wards of Glasgow City Council